HMS Spartiate has been the name of two ships of the Royal Navy.  The first was a captured French prize, the second was mostly likely named after this ship.

  was a 74-gun third-rate ship of the line. She was captured from the French at the Battle of the Nile and fought at the Battle of Trafalgar on the British side.
  was a  launched in 1898 and broken up in 1932.

HMS Spartiate was also a former Royal Navy shore establishment in 
St Enoch's Hotel Glasgow Western Approaches Command, Clyde

References

Royal Navy ship names